The Big Iron Farm Show is a large farm show held on the grounds of the Red River Valley Fairgrounds in West Fargo, North Dakota.  The show started in 1980 in Casselton, North Dakota, but moved to West Fargo in 1981.

Crowds were much smaller in 2020. Since that year, attendees had to obey strict measures, such as wearing masks & social distancing.

External links
Big Iron Farm Show website

North Dakota culture
Agricultural shows in the United States
West Fargo, North Dakota
Recurring events established in 1980
Tourist attractions in Cass County, North Dakota